Gare de Vierzon-Ville is a railway station serving the town Vierzon, Cher department, central France. It is situated on the Orléans–Montauban railway, the Vierzon–Saincaize railway and the Vierzon–Saint-Pierre-des-Corps railway.

Services

The station is served by Intercités (long distance) services to Paris, Toulouse, Nantes and Lyon, and by regional services (TER Centre-Val de Loire) to Nevers, Tours, Orléans and Limoges.

References

Railway stations in Cher
Railway stations in France opened in 1847